The Kids Grow Up is a 1976 Argentine film directed by Enrique Carreras.

Cast

 Adriana Aguirre

External links
 

1976 films
1970s Spanish-language films
Argentine coming-of-age films
1970s Argentine films
Films directed by Enrique Carreras